"Bow Down" is the lead single released from the Westside Connection's debut album of the same name.

The song became the most successful single released by the group, peaking at number 21 on the Billboard Hot 100, while also topping the rap chart at number one. As one of the more popular West Coast hip hop songs, it has appeared on numerous compilations, including Featuring...Ice Cube, The N.W.A Legacy, Vol. 1 and Ice Cube's 2001 Greatest Hits album, among others. It also appeared in the 2002 film, The Hot Chick.

This song is parodied in the comedy show Mind of Mencia, in which Carlos Mencia makes a sketch about 4 rappers making songs about their experiences behind bars.

Chart history

Peak positions

Year-End charts

In popular culture
The song is featured in the reissued version of Grand Theft Auto V, and in the 2015 comedy film, Get Hard.

References

1996 debut singles
Westside Connection songs
Gangsta rap songs
G-funk songs
1996 songs
Songs written by Ice Cube
Songs written by Mack 10
Songs written by WC (rapper)